In Philippine folk culture, lihí is a condition of pregnancy food craving in which a notable characteristic is that pregnant women usually desire food such as sour, unripe mango with bagoong. While it is a cultural concept restricted among the Filipinos, analogous cultural phenomena of pregnancy food cravings have been observed in various cultures. It is still debatable as to whether lihí can be classified and established as either a biological or psychological condition or a purely social and cultural one.

Superstitions
Lihí also broadly encompasses a folk belief that whatever a woman had craved during pregnancy will imprint characteristics on the child. The period of the lihi is usually the first trimester of the pregnancy. When a child resembles a manatee, for example, it is said that the mother enjoyed looking at that particular animal during the gestational period. The lihi period is also the time when the expectant mother is allegedly susceptible to supernatural creatures which might play pranks on her. She might also develop a strong dislike against her husband.

In other regions, lihí refers to the belief that any sensory stimuli imbibed by a pregnant woman influences the development of her child. Among some ethnic groups in the northern Philippines, it is taboo to mention anything about animals such as rats or pigs near a pregnant woman for fear that her child may acquire the features of the mentioned animals.

See also
Food craving

References

Health in the Philippines
Superstitions of the Philippines
Tagalog words and phrases
Austronesian spirituality